Local elections were held in Parañaque City on May 9, 2016 within the Philippine general election. The voters elected for the elective local posts in the city: the mayor, vice mayor, the congressman, and the councilors, eight of them in the two districts of the city.

Background
Incumbent City Mayor Edwin Olivarez will be seeking a reelection this 2016 election, running under the Liberal Party unopposed.

Jeremy Marquez, the son of former city mayor Joey Marquez, ran for vice mayor against incumbent vice mayor Rico Golez, who is Olivarez's running mate.

Celebrities and prominent personalities will also try to get a seat in the city council. This includes dancer Bok Inciong of Masculados, comedians Ryan Yllana and Vandolph Quizon, singer Roselle Nava, actor Jomari Yllana, basketball coach Binky Favis, and Hubert Webb, who is known to be the primary mastermind in the 1991 Vizconde massacre.

Results
Names written in bold-Italic are the re-elected incumbents while in italic are incumbents lost in elections.

For Mayor
Mayor Edwin Olivarez was re-elected unopposed.

Vice Mayor
Vice Mayor Jose Enrico "Rico" Golez defeated Jeremy Marquez in a tight election.

For Representative

First District 
Rep. Eric Olivarez was re-elected.

Second District
Rep. Gustavo Tambunting won over former Rep. Roilo Golez in a tight election.

City Councilors

First District

|-bgcolor=black
|colspan=12|

Second District

|-bgcolor=black
|colspan=12|

References

2016 Philippine local elections
Elections in Parañaque
2016 elections in Metro Manila